Frankenstein (stylised as FRANKƐN5TƐ1N) is a 2015 updated adaptation of Mary Shelley's 1818 novel Frankenstein; or, The Modern Prometheus, directed by Bernard Rose. The film is told from the monster's point of view, as he is created, escapes into the modern world, and learns about the dark side of humanity.

Plot 
Victor Frankenstein (Danny Huston) and his wife, Elizabeth (Carrie-Anne Moss), are scientists who bring to life Adam, a fully-grown, handsome young man (Xavier Samuel) with the mind of an infant. Adam's cells fail to replicate correctly, and he soon develops deformities on his face and body. Dr. Frankenstein attempts to euthanize his creation with lethal injections, but Adam thrashes and screams as the chemicals surge through his body. Victor then chokes him. Later, two scientists attempt to dissect an apparently dead Adam, but he regains consciousness and kills both men.

Adam escapes into a nearby forest and lives by scavenging. He adopts a friendly stray dog with which he travels to the city. In a park, he meets a little girl (Mckenna Grace) and they play a game of throwing sticks into a lake. Adam, still thinking that it is a game, picks up the girl and throws her into the water, as well. She starts to drown, so he jumps in and saves her. When he brings her to shore, however, two policemen try to arrest him and shoot his barking dog to death. Adam assaults one officer and kills the other for killing his dog. A vigilante mob then chases Adam down while calling him a monster.

Adam is taken to a police station, where he is put into a straitjacket. When officers ask his name, Adam replies with "Monster", using the name the mob used for him, the same name he would use for himself in all social interactions. Almost completely nonverbal, he gives them Elizabeth's identification badge and calls her his mom. Elizabeth is brought to the station and denies knowing Adam, effectively abandoning him.

Two vengeful policemen drive Adam to an empty lot, beat him, and shoot him in the head, but he survives, awakens hours later, and wanders until he meets Eddie, a blind, homeless man (Tony Todd). Recognizing a childlike soul, Eddie kindly takes Adam under his wing. Adam's deformities worsen, but he continues to learn about the world and his ability to speak improves.

Sometime later, Eddie convinces a friendly prostitute named Wanda (Maya Erskine) to take Adam to a hotel to have sex with him, but Wanda insists that he shower first. After he emerges from the shower, Wanda realizes how extensive his deformities are, so tries to leave. Distraught, Adam snaps her spine while trying to prevent her from leaving. Eddie, having heard Wanda's screams, enters the room and discovers that she is dead. He then angrily beats Adam with his cane. Adam ends up accidentally killing Eddie, as well.

Feeling hopeless and angry, he uses the GPS on Wanda's phone to guide him to the Frankensteins' residence. While walking along a highway, Adam encounters two police officers, one of them being Officer Banks, the same officer who shot him in the head several days earlier. The officers order Adam to stop. Instead, Adam grabs Banks' gun and shoots his partner. Banks and Adam recognize each other and Adam shoots Banks in the head.

Adam encounters the Frankensteins after arriving at their luxurious home. Adam attacks Victor, but Elizabeth calms him down. They show Adam his true origins and tell him that they named him Adam. He is angry to learn that he was created by the Frankensteins and that Victor was already attempting to replace him with another artificially created human. While Adam is distracted, Victor knocks him down and injects him with a sedative. Victor then attempts to decapitate him with a surgical handsaw while he is unconscious. Elizabeth tries to stop Victor by hitting him with a metal tray. Victor then swings the saw at her and accidentally slices her neck open. Victor flees and Elizabeth quickly bleeds to death.

Adam takes Elizabeth's body into the nearby woods. He solemnly builds a large fire which he uses to immolate both Elizabeth and himself. While engulfed in flames, he cries, "I am Adam!"

Cast 

Xavier Samuel as Adam
Carrie-Anne Moss as Elizabeth Frankenstein
Danny Huston as Victor Frankenstein
Tony Todd as Eddie
Maya Erskine as Wanda
Mckenna Grace as Molly
Matthew Jacobs as Dr. Marcus
Jeff Hilliard as Officer Banks
Jorge Luis Pallo as Officer Lincoln
Ron Roggé as Officer Woodcrock
Rob Mars as Officer Crawford
Mary Gallagher as Amy Johnson
John Lacy as Mark Ruby
Jeordie Osbourne White as Skid Row Man

Release
The film premiered April 12, 2015, at the Brussels International Fantastic Film Festival, followed by the Louisiana International Film Festival on May 9, 2015. The film was released on home video on February 23, 2016.

Reception
Rotten Tomatoes has the film at 100%, based on 10 reviews. Pat Torfe for Bloody Disgusting said "A strong central performance by Samuel, with some great modern reimaginings of scenes from the novel that perfectly mirror the original story, make for an emotional and dramatic horror tale." Louis H.C., also writing for Bloody Disgusting, said of the film, "Rarely have we seen the Modern Prometheus translated so earnestly on the big screen" and "If you’re a fan of the original story or just in the mood for some stellar storytelling, give this one a shot." Gareth Jones, writing for Dread Central, gave the film four and a half stars, writing, "Melodramatic at turns, Bernard Rose’s Frankenstein is nonetheless a remarkably affecting piece of filmmaking sporting some wince-inducing gore and extreme violence."

References

External links
 
 

2015 films
American science fiction horror films
2015 horror films
Films directed by Bernard Rose (director)
Frankenstein films
Films with screenplays by Bernard Rose (director)
2010s English-language films
2010s American films